Gemilang Coachwork Sdn Bhd ("GML") is a manufacturer of commercial vehicles including but not limited to buses and coaches. Based in Malaysia, GML specialises in designing and manufacturing bus bodies and the assembly of buses. GML is also one of the first companies in Malaysia to assemble fully electric buses. 

GML is a wholly-owned subsidiary of Gemilang International Limited, which issued shares are listed on the Main Board of Hong Kong Stock Exchange (Stock Code: 6163 HK).

History
Gemilang Coachwork was founded on 23 September 1989 to assemble wooden bodies for bus and truck chassis. Today, GML is a reputable bus body builder with a track record of exporting more than 3,000 buses to the United States, Australia, Singapore, UAE, China, Hong Kong, New Zealand, Vietnam and other countries for a wide range of international chassis manufacturers and bus operators.  

GML first export their products by entering the Australian market and exported over 100 units in 1999. Other notable orders from the export markets include 1,101 Scania K230UB buses for SBS Transit, 734 MAN NL323F (A22) for SMRT Buses of Singapore and 790 Scania K250UB and K270UB buses for Rapid Bus of Malaysia. Another notable example is the MAN Lion's City DD L concept bus, which had its bodywork fitted by Gemilang on the MAN ND323F (A95) chassis for the Land Transport Authority of Singapore.

In 2021, GML delivered more than 100 units of fully electric buses to the USA and Australia.

Products
Gemilang Coachwork currently offers various aluminium bus bodywork designs (including the licensed MAN Lion's City bodywork range) and configurations that could be customised to meet different manufacturers, operators and regional requirements. Over the years, GML had supplied bodies for BYD, Daewoo, Dennis, GreenPower Motor, Hino, Hyundai, King Long, MAN, Mercedes-Benz, Nissan Diesel, Scania, Sunlong, Volvo and Yutong bus chassis.

References

External links

1989 establishments in Malaysia
Companies listed on the Hong Kong Stock Exchange
Bus manufacturers of Malaysia
Malaysian companies established in 1989
Privately held companies of Malaysia
Malaysian brands
Manufacturing companies established in 1989